Black Sun is the fourth studio release and first concept album by German power metal band Primal Fear.

A music video was made for "Armageddon".

In 2017, Loudwire ranked it as the 19th best power metal album of all time.

Album Concept 
The record is themed around a space exploration mission. A team of astronauts visit a new, never before seen planet, and their craft ends up blowing up in the process of reentry into the Earth's atmosphere. The person or thing they are speaking to in 'Armageddon' is often considered by fans to be the eagle that appears on the covers of the majority of their albums.

Track listing 
All songs written by Primal Fear

Personnel 
 Ralf Scheepers - lead vocals
 Stefan Leibing - guitars
 Henny Wolter - guitars
 Mat Sinner - bass guitar, vocals
 Klaus Sperling - drums

Additional Musicians
"Metal" Mike Chlasciak - additional guitar on "Fear" and "Controlled"

Production 
Achim "Akeem" Köhler - Producer, Engineering, Mixing, Mastering
Mat Sinner - Producer
Justin Leeah - Engineering (additional)
Ralf Scheepers - Producer
Klaus Sperling - Producer
Stefan Leibing - Producer
Henny Wolter - Producer
Stephan Lohrmann - Cover art
Thomas Ewerhard - Artwork
Roland Guth - Photography

References 

2002 albums
Primal Fear (band) albums
Nuclear Blast albums
Concept albums